Agustín Millán Vivero (July 24, 1879 in Texcaltitlán – March 18, 1920) was a Mexican general and politician.

Biography 
Millán moved to Orizaba, when he was 20 years old, where he worked as a carpenter. In 1909, during the beginning revolution in Mexico, he joined the Partido Antirreeleccionista (Anti-Reelection party), and supported Francisco I. Madero. In 1913 he fought in the rank of a second lieutenant under General Cándido Aguilar (División de Oriente) against Victoriano Huerta, who substituted him temporarily as military commander and as governor of Veracruz in 1915. On June 30, 1917, in the rank of a Brigadier General, he followed Carlos Tejada as Governor of the State of Mexico, supported by the Club Democrático Progresista. During this period, he was two times absent because of military reasons. The first time, Joaquín García Luna acted in place of him from September 6, 1918, to March 4, 1919. When the rebellion in Agua Prieta exploded, he accompanied President Venustiano Carranza. At this time, Francisco Javier Gaxiola acted in place of him from September 11, 1919, to March 8, 1920. Millán became injured in the battle actions. Due to his bad physical constitution, Darío López became interim governor on March 13, a few days before Millán died in consequence of his injuries.

References 

1879 births
1920 deaths
Politicians from the State of Mexico
Governors of Veracruz
Governors of the State of Mexico
Mexican generals
People of the Mexican Revolution